Gonzague Saint Bris (16 January 1948 – 8 August 2017) was an award-winning French novelist, biographer, and journalist. He won the 2002 Prix Interallié for Les Vieillards de Brighton. He was the founder of La Forêt des livres, an annual book festival, and the Cabourg Film Festival. He was also a juror for the prix Contrepoint, a French literary award. With his family, he was a co-proprietor of Clos Lucé.

References

1948 births
2017 deaths
People from Loches
French male novelists
Writers from Centre-Val de Loire
20th-century French novelists
21st-century French novelists
Male biographers
20th-century biographers
21st-century biographers
French male journalists
20th-century French journalists
21st-century French journalists
20th-century French male writers
21st-century French male writers
Road incident deaths in France
Prix Interallié winners